Carl-Axel Roslund (born 4 November 1948) is a Swedish politician of the Moderate Party, member of the Riksdag 2002–2006.

References

Members of the Riksdag from the Moderate Party
Living people
1948 births
Members of the Riksdag 2002–2006
Place of birth missing (living people)